Vertigo ("Dizziness. Feelings.") is a 1990 novel and the first by the German author W. G. Sebald. The first of its four sections, titled 'Beyle, or Love is a Madness Most Discreet', is a short but conventional biography of Stendhal, who is referred to not by his pen name but by his birth name of Beyle. The second, 'All'estero', is a travelogue of two journeys made to the Alpine region by an unnamed narrator whose biography resembles Sebald's; an episode from the life of Casanova is also featured. The third, 'Dr K Takes the Waters at Riva', describes a difficult period in the life of Franz Kafka, referred to only as "Dr. K." Kafka's short story The Hunter Gracchus is re-told in summary form and the meaning of the hunter's ceaseless voyage interpreted by the narrator as Kafka's penitence for a longing for love. And the fourth, 'Il ritorno in patria', is a nostalgic recounting of the narrator's visit to his German hometown of "W," a rural village which he has seen nothing of for decades. The narrator recalls one of the town's residents, Hans Schlag the huntsman, who, falling to his death, suffers the same fate as the huntsman in Kafka's short story. Sebald makes notable use of leitmotif, such as sensations of dizziness as suggested in the title, and deceased persons lying covered on platforms. The novel functions along with Sebald's subsequent works The Emigrants and The Rings of Saturn as a trilogy. All three works were translated into English by Michael Hulse in partnership with Sebald.

Reception
Stephen Moss of The Guardian found the book difficult to characterize, but embraced it critically.

See also
 1990 in literature
 German literature

References

1990 German novels
German-language novels
Novels by W. G. Sebald
1990 debut novels